is a Japanese idol and singer, and former member of the Japanese idol girl group AKB48. She was a member of AKB48's Team K. She is an alumna of Seijo University, where she studied economics and also earned her postgraduate degree, as well as a certified weather presenter.

Career

2011 
Muto passed the AKB48 12th generation audition for the trainee section in February 2011. She was featured in AKB48 Single for the first time in Kaze wa Fuiteiru, in the coupling song "Tsubomitachi". She didn't qualify in rock-paper-scissors tournament on September 20, 2011.

2012 
She was promoted to Team K after the AKB48 Tokyo Dome Shuffle on August 24, 2012.  In the elections for the 27th single of AKB48, she placed 49th overall with 6,428 votes and became the center of Future Girls. She is the center of Gingham Check's coupling song, "Show Fight!". "Show Fight!" remained one of few songs to rank on every Request Hour since first participation. She didn't qualify in rock-paper-scissors tournament on September 18, 2012.

2013 
In the elections for the 32nd single of AKB48, she placed 45th overall with 16,221 votes and became Next Girls and was featured in Koi Suru Fortune Cookie's coupling song, "Kondo Koso Ecstasy". She was eliminated in first round in rock-paper-scissors tournament on September 18, 2013, she was lost to Jurina Matsui, who would win that tournament. Even though she didn't place in the tournament, she was featured in Suzukake Nanchara's coupling song, "Mosh & Dive".

2014 
On January 9, 2014, she was being selected as one of the 50 winners of the Young Jump Gravure Competition. On February 24, 2014, during the AKB48 Group Daisokaku Matsuri, it was announced that she was transferred to team A. In the elections for the 37th single of AKB48, she placed 24th overall with 30,097 votes and became Undergirls and was featured in Kokoro no Placard's coupling song, "Dareka ga Nageta Ball". She became senbatsu for the first time in Kibōteki Refrain. She was eliminated in second round in rock-paper-scissors tournament on September 17, 2014.

2015 
She was transferred back to Team K after the AKB48 Spring Shuffle 2015 on March 26, 2015. She was being chosen for senbatsu in Bokutachi wa Tatakawanai, which contained a voting card for AKB48 41st Single Senbatsu Sousenkyo. She was also featured in Bokutachi wa Tatakawanai's coupling song, "Summer side". In the elections for the 41st single of AKB48, she placed 16th overall with 44,637 votes and became senbatsu of Halloween Night.  She was eliminated in second round in rock-paper-scissors tournament on September 16, 2015. She got the 2nd place in the last round voting for the audition held by Young Magazine and won a 1-year exclusive gravure contract with the magazine. Her first solo gravure under the contract was published on November 9, 2015.

2016 
She was being chosen for senbatsu again in Tsubasa wa Iranai, which contained a voting card for AKB48 45th Single Senbatsu Sousenkyo. In the elections for the 45th single of AKB48, she placed 10th overall with 58,624 votes and became senbatsu of Love Trip / Shiawase o Wakenasai. She was eliminated in first round in rock-paper-scissors tournament on October 10, 2016.

2017 
Muto graduated from the economics department of Seijo University. She enrolled into a master's degree program the same year.

She was being chosen for senbatsu again in Shoot Sign and Negaigoto no Mochigusare, both of two singles she was featured as media senbatsu for the first time. She applied for the AKB48 49th Single Senbatsu Sousenkyo, but retired her application on April 12, 2017. She formed "Okapa-zu" unit with Nao Furuhata and Nana Fujita to participate in AKB48 Group Unit Janken Tournament 2017. They were eliminated in first round in rock-paper-scissors tournament on September 24, 2017.

2018 
She featured in Teacher Teacher's coupling song, "Shuuden no Yoru". This was the first time she was featured in an AKB48 single since Negaigoto no Mochigusare. In the elections for the 45th single of AKB48, she placed 7th overall with 62,611 votes and became senbatsu of AKB48 53rd Single. She also joined Produce 48 as one of 39 girls from AKB48 to form a Korean-Japanese group that will promote for two and a half years. They will adopt the AKB48's concept of "idols you can meet and greet" and be able to perform in their own theatre. Members of the group will be able to promote under their own agencies concurrently. In the grade evaluation, she was given a D grade and stayed in Class D after the re-evaluation. In the battle evaluation, she was one of members who performed GFriend's Love Whisper as Team 1. They lost the battle to Team 2 and didn't receive a benefit of 1000 votes. As of Episode 5, she ranked 33 and survived the elimination round. In the position evaluation, she was in the team which chose the song "HandClap" by Fitz and The Tantrums, she ranked 5th place out of the 6 people in her group, she did not get any benefit. As of Episode 8, she ranked 38 and was eliminated.

2019 
In November 2019, Muto acted in Battles Without Honor and Humanity: On'na-tachi no Shitō-hen, a stage adaptation of the Battles Without Honor and Humanity yakuza film series. She played the role of Tetsuya Sakai, based on Hiroki Matsukata's original portrayal.

2020 
On March 23, Muto announced that she has completed her postgraduate study at Seijo University.

2021 
On August 17, Muto announced that she joined Ikushimakikaku (formed by ex-TBS announcer  Hiroshi Ikushima) as her new agency, this follows the tradition of AKB48 members transferring from in-house to major agencies such as fellow members Nana Okada and Rin Okabe. It's unknown if Orin will follow suit.

2022 
During the second day of AKB48's 60th single release commemorative concert in Nippon Budokan, she announced her graduation from the group. She stated that Hisashiburi no Lip Gloss is her last participated single. She participated in B-side titled "Unmei no Uta" in which she centered. Meanwhile, she would still be active within group activities until March 8, 2023.

Personal life 
Muto's younger sister, Orin, also joined AKB48 as a 16th Generation member, and from 2018 to 2022, both of them are in Team K until Orin was transferred to Team A in April 2022. She also has a younger brother, who is older than Orin. They own a pet beagle named Oguri.

Discography

Singles with AKB48

Albums with AKB48
 Koko ni Ita Koto
 "High school days" (Kenkyuusei)
 "Koko ni Ita Koto" (AKB48 + SKE48 + NMB48)
 1830m
 "Lemon no Toshigoro"
 "Sakuranbo to Kodoku" (Kenkyuusei)
 "Aozora yo Sabishikunai Ka?" (AKB48 + SKE48 + NMB48 + HKT48)
 Tsugi no Ashiato
 "Kyouhansha" (Team K)
 Koko ga Rhodes da, Koko de Tobe!
 "Oh! Baby" (Team A)
 "Downtown Hotel 100 Goushitsu"
 0 to 1 no Aida
 "Ai no Shisha" (Team K)
 "Hajimari no Yuki"
 Thumbnail
 "Ano Hi no Jibun"
 "Subete wa Tochuu Keika"

Appearances

Movies 
 Lady Maiko (2014)
 Hiroshima Piano (2020), Nanako Eguchi

Dramas 
 So long! Episode 2 (NTV, 2013)
 Majisuka Gakuen 4 (2015)
 Majisuka Gakuen 5 (2015)
 Kyabasuka Gakuen (2016)
 AKB Horror Night Adrenaline no Yoru (2015)
 AKB Love Night Koi Koujou (2016)

Survival show 
 Produce 48 (2018)

Variety shows 
 AKBINGO!
 Shukan AKB
 AKB48 no Anta, Dare?
 Bimyo-na Tobira AKB48 no GachiChallenge
 Ariyoshi AKB Kyowakoku
 AKB48 Konto "Nani mo Soko Made..."
 AKB48 Konto "Bimyo~"
 AKB48 SHOW!
 AKB Shirabe
 AKB Kousagi Dojo

Radio 
 AKB48 no All Night Nippon
 Bayfm ON8+1
 AKB Radio Drama Gekijou
 LISTEN? ~Live 4 Life~
 LISTEN 2 to 3
 AKB48 Konya wa Kaeranai
 Recomen!
 Appare yattema-su!

Commercials 
 Shinsei Bank Lake (Paripipo, Nandemo Share, Jiwajiwakuru Shiawase) (2015-2016)
 Breathe Right Web Campaign (2015-2016)

References

1994 births
Living people
AKB48 members
Japanese idols
Produce 48 contestants
21st-century Japanese women singers
21st-century Japanese singers
Seijo University alumni